Duke of Buccleuch, formerly also spelt Duke of Buccleugh, is a title in the Peerage of Scotland created twice on 20 April 1663, first for James Scott, 1st Duke of Monmouth and second suo jure for his wife Anne Scott, 4th Countess of Buccleuch. Monmouth, the eldest illegitimate son of Charles II was attainted after  rebelling against his uncle James II and VII, but his wife's title was unaffected and passed on to their descendants, who have successively borne the surnames Scott, Montagu-Scott, Montagu Douglas Scott and Scott again.  In 1810, the 3rd Duke of Buccleuch inherited the Dukedom of Queensberry, also in the Peerage of Scotland, thus separating that title from the Marquessate of Queensberry. 

The substantial origin of the ducal house of the Scotts of Buccleuch dates back to the large grants of lands in Scotland to Sir Walter Scott of Kirkurd and Buccleuch, a border chief, by James II, in consequence of the fall of William Douglas, 8th Earl of Douglas (1452), but the family traced their descent back to a Sir Richard le Scott (1240–1285). Sir Walter Scott of Branxholme and Buccleuch (died 1552) distinguished himself at the Battle of Pinkie Cleugh (1547). His great-grandson Sir Walter was created Lord Scott of Buccleuch in 1606.

Other subsidiary titles associated with the Dukedom of Buccleuch are: Earl of Buccleuch (1619), Earl of Dalkeith (1663) and Lord Scott of Whitchester and Eskdaill (1619) (all in the Peerage of Scotland). The Duke also holds the two subsidiary titles of the attainted Dukedom of Monmouth, namely Earl of Doncaster (1663) and Baron Scott of Tindale (1663) (both in the Peerage of England), and several subsidiary titles associated with the Dukedom of Queensberry, namely Marquess of Dumfriesshire (1683), Earl of Drumlanrig and Sanquhar (1682), Viscount of Nith, Tortholwald and Ross (1682) and Lord Douglas of Kilmount, Middlebie and Dornock (1682) (all in the Peerage of Scotland). The Earldom of Doncaster and Barony of Scott of Tindale had been forfeit at the time of the first Duke's attainder, but the titles were restored to the 2nd Duke of Buccleuch in 1742. Until 1835, the Dukes also held lands in the West Riding of Yorkshire and the ancient title of Lord of Bowland. The Duke of Buccleuch is the hereditary chief of Clan Scott. The holder is one of only five people in the UK to hold two or more different dukedoms, the others being the Duke of Cornwall, Rothesay, and Cambridge (all currently held by The Prince of Wales), the Duke of Hamilton and Brandon, the Duke of Argyll (who holds two dukedoms named Argyll), and the Duke of Richmond, Lennox and Gordon. 

The courtesy title used by the Duke's eldest son and heir is Earl of Dalkeith; and that of Lord Dalkeith's eldest son and heir is Lord Eskdaill.

The novelist Sir Walter Scott, Bart., was directly descended of the Lords of Buccleuch.  His family history, fancifully interpreted, is the main subject of much of The Lay of the Last Minstrel.

The current Duke of Buccleuch, Richard Scott, the 10th Duke, is one of the largest private landowners in Scotland with some 200,000 acres (over 80,000 hectares) and chairman of the Buccleuch Group, a holding company with interests in commercial property, rural affairs, food, and beverages. The title originally comes from a holding in the Scottish Borders, near Selkirk.

The family seats are Bowhill House, three miles from Selkirk, representing the Scott line; Drumlanrig Castle in Dumfries and Galloway, representing the Douglas line; and Boughton House in Northamptonshire, England, representing the Montagu line. These three houses are still lived in by the family and are also open to the public. The family also owns Dalkeith Palace in Midlothian, which is let, and has owned several other country houses and castles in the past. Its historic London residence was Montagu House, Whitehall, now demolished and replaced by the Ministry of Defence.

William Montagu Douglas Scott, The Earl of Dalkeith, who became the 7th Duke of Buccleuch was elected President of St. Andrew's Ambulance Association in 1908. The Presidency of the Association (now St Andrew's First Aid) has been held by the Buccleuch family from that date.

Most of the Dukes of Buccleuch (the 3rd, 4th, 5th, 6th, 7th) are buried in the Buccleuch Memorial Chapel in St. Mary's Episcopal Church, Dalkeith, Midlothian. The 2nd Duke (died 1751) is buried in Eton College Chapel. The most recent Dukes (the 8th and 9th) are buried among the ruins of Melrose Abbey in Melrose.

Dukes of Buccleuch are invariably granted the honour of Knight in the Order of the Thistle.

Feudal barons of Buccleuch (1488)
David Scott, 1st of Buccleuch (died )
Walter Scott, 2nd of Buccleuch (died )
Walter Scott of Branxholme and Buccleuch, 3rd of Buccleuch (died 1552)
Walter Scott, 4th of Buccleuch (–1574)
Walter Scott, 5th of Buccleuch (1565–1611) (created Lord Scott of Buccleuch in 1606)

Lords Scott of Buccleuch (1606)
Walter Scott, 1st Lord Scott of Buccleuch (1565–1611), son of the 4th Baron
Walter Scott, 2nd Lord Scott of Buccleuch (died 1633) (created Earl of Buccleuch in 1619)

Earls of Buccleuch (1619)
Walter Scott, 1st Earl of Buccleuch (died 1633)
Francis Scott, 2nd Earl of Buccleuch (1626–1651)
Mary Scott, 3rd Countess of Buccleuch (1647–1661)
Anne Scott, 4th Countess of Buccleuch (1651–1732) was created Duchess of Buccleuch in 1663

Dukes of Buccleuch, first Creation (1663)
James Scott, 1st Duke of Monmouth, 1st Duke of Buccleuch (1649–1685) was executed for the Monmouth Rebellion and his honours forfeit

Dukes of Buccleuch, second Creation (1663)
Anne Scott, 1st Duchess of Buccleuch (1651–1732)
Francis Scott, 2nd Duke of Buccleuch (1695–1751)
Henry Scott, 3rd Duke of Buccleuch, 5th Duke of Queensberry (1746–1812) (succeeded as Duke of Queensberry)
Charles William Henry Montagu Scott, 4th Duke of Buccleuch, 6th Duke of Queensberry (1772–1819), second son of the 3rd Duke
Walter Francis Montagu Douglas Scott, 5th Duke of Buccleuch, 7th Duke of Queensberry (1806–1884)
William Henry Walter Montagu Douglas Scott, 6th Duke of Buccleuch, 8th Duke of Queensberry (1831–1914)
John Charles Montagu Douglas Scott, 7th Duke of Buccleuch, 9th Duke of Queensberry (1864–1935)
Walter John Montagu Douglas Scott, 8th Duke of Buccleuch, 10th Duke of Queensberry (1894–1973)
Walter Francis John Montagu Douglas Scott, 9th Duke of Buccleuch, 11th Duke of Queensberry (1923–2007)
Richard Walter John Montagu Douglas Scott, 10th Duke of Buccleuch, 12th Duke of Queensberry (b. 1954)

The heir apparent is the present holder's son Walter John Francis Montagu Douglas Scott, Earl of Dalkeith (b. 1984)
The heir apparent's heir apparent is his son, Willoughby Ralph Montagu Douglas Scott, Lord Eskdaill (b. 2016)

 Walter Montagu Douglas Scott, 5th Duke of Buccleuch, 7th Duke of Queensberry (1806–1884)
 William Montagu Douglas Scott, 6th Duke of Buccleuch, 8th Duke of Queensberry (1831–1914)
 John Montagu Douglas Scott, 7th Duke of Buccleuch, 9th Duke of Queensberry (1864–1935)
 Walter Montagu Douglas Scott, 8th Duke of Buccleuch, 10th Duke of Queensberry (1894–1973)
 John Montagu Douglas Scott, 9th Duke of Buccleuch, 11th Duke of Queensberry (1923–2007)
 Richard Montagu Douglas Scott, 10th Duke of Buccleuch, 12th Duke of Queensberry (b. 1954)
(1). Walter Montagu Douglas Scott, Earl of Dalkeith (b. 1984)
(2). Willoughby Montagu Douglas Scott, Lord Eskdaill (b. 2016)
(3).  Lord Charles David Peter Montagu Douglas Scott (b. 1987)
(4). Rufus Peter Francis Montagu Douglas Scott (b. 2017)
(5). Wilfred Richard Montagu Douglas Scott (b. 2019)
(6). Lord William Henry John Montagu Douglas Scott (b. 1957)
(7). Lord Damian Torquil Francis Charles Montagu Douglas Scott (b. 1970)
(8). Alexander Edward James Montagu Douglas Scott (b. 2002) 
(9). Orlando John Sebastian Montagu Douglas Scott (b. 2009) 
Lord William Montagu-Douglas-Scott (1896–1958)
male issue in line
Lord George William Montagu Douglas Scott (1866–1947)
John Henry Montagu Douglas Scott (1911–1991)
male issue in line
Claud Everard Walter Montagu Douglas Scott (1915–1994)
male issue in line
Lord Herbert Andrew Montagu Douglas Scott (1872–1943)
Andrew Montagu Douglas Scott (1906–1971)
male issue in line
 Henry Douglas-Scott-Montagu, 1st Baron Montagu of Beaulieu (1832–1905)
Barons Montagu of Beaulieu

Coats of Arms

Family Tree

In media
Nick Carraway, the narrator of F. Scott Fitzgerald's The Great Gatsby, says his family has "a tradition that we're descended from the Dukes of Buccleuch", but then points out that this is not true.

See also

Buccleuch, Scottish Borders
Clan Douglas
Clan Scott
Clan Stewart as they are descendants of the Duke of Monmouth, the eldest illegitimate son of King Charles II
 – several ships with that name

References

Attribution

External links
Buccleuch Estates
 Montagu-Douglas-Scott Family Tree 

Dukedoms in the Peerage of Scotland
Lists of Scottish people
Scottish society
Dumfries and Galloway

British landowners
Forfeited dukedoms in the Peerage of Scotland
Noble titles created in 1663